Crescent Dawn is a Dirk Pitt novel, the twenty-first of that series.  The hardcover edition was released November 16, 2010.  Other editions were released on earlier dates.

Plot
As are most Dirk Pitt novels, the story begins with one or more historical prologues:  an attack on a Roman galley in 327 AD, and an episode in 1916 in which a British warship mysteriously explodes and sinks in the North Sea.  In the present, important mosques in Egypt and Turkey are damaged by planted explosives.  While doing underwater explorations off Turkey and on the Israeli coasts, Dirk Pitt and Dirk Pitt, Jr., face villainous characters who cause them both to become involved in uncovering a plot to resurrect the Ottoman Empire. Summer Pitt, the elder Pitt's daughter, stumbles upon a manifest in England that dates to the time of Jesus and sheds new light on early Christianity.  The Pitts and NUMA, for whom they work, become involved in action-packed episodes throughout the book.  Clive Cussler makes two cameo appearances in this book, as he has a habit of doing in many of his novels.

References

Dirk Pitt novels
2010 American novels
G. P. Putnam's Sons books
Novels by Clive Cussler
Collaborative novels